Georgia–Malaysia relations are foreign relations between Georgia and Malaysia.  Both countries established diplomatic relation on May 7, 1993.  Georgia has an embassy in Kuala Lumpur. The Georgian embassy was established in December 2013. As of 2015, there was no Malaysian embassy in Georgia, Malaysia is represented in Georgia through its embassy in Kyiv (Ukraine).

In 2018, a free trade agreement was proposed between the two countries. Malaysia has voiced support for Georgia's territorial integrity. Georiga has also sought closer relations with Malaysia via closer relations with the ASEAN grouping, and applied for observer status at the Asean Inter-Parliamentary Assembly in September 2017.

See also  
 Foreign relations of Georgia
 Foreign relations of Malaysia

External links 
  Georgian Ministry of Foreign Affairs about relations with Malaysia

References

 

 
Malaysia
Bilateral relations of Malaysia